The 1993 Dunhill Cup was the ninth Dunhill Cup. It was a team tournament featuring 16 countries, each represented by three players. The Cup was played 14–17 October at the Old Course at St Andrews in Scotland. The sponsor was the Alfred Dunhill company. The American team of Fred Couples, John Daly, and Payne Stewart beat the English team of Peter Baker, Nick Faldo, and Mark James in the final. It was the second win for the United States.

Format
The Cup was a match play event played over four days. The teams were divided into four four-team groups. The top eight teams were seeded with the remaining teams randomly placed in the groups. After three rounds of round-robin play, the top team in each group advanced to a single elimination playoff.

In each team match, the three players were paired with their opponents and played 18 holes at medal match play. Matches tied at the end of 18 holes were extended to a sudden-death playoff. The tie-breaker for ties within a group was based on match record, then head-to-head.

Group play

Round one
Source:

Group 1

McGinley won on the fourth playoff hole.

Group 2

Group 3

Group 4

Rutledge won on the first playoff hole.
Parry won on the second playoff hole.

Round two
Source:

Group 1

Romero won on the first playoff hole.
Johnstone won on the third playoff hole.

Group 2

Espinoza won on the first playoff hole.

Group 3

Franco won on the second playoff hole.

Group 4

Parry won on the second playoff hole.

Round three
Source:

Group 1

Rivero won on the second playoff hole.

Group 2

Group 3

Group 4

Standings

Playoffs
Source:

Bracket

Semi-finals

Final

Team results

Player results

References

Alfred Dunhill Cup
Dunhill Cup
Dunhill Cup
Dunhill Cup